Brittle systems theory creates an analogy between communication theory and mechanical systems. A brittle system is a system characterized by a sudden and steep decline in performance as the system state changes. This can be due to input parameters that exceed a specified input, or environmental conditions that exceed specified operating boundaries. This is the opposite of a gracefully degrading system. Brittle system analysis develops an analogy with materials science in order to analyze system brittleness. A system that is brittle (but initially robust enough to gain at least some foothold in the marketplace) will tend to operate with acceptable performance until it reaches a limit and then degrade suddenly and catastrophically. The table below illustrates the concept behind the analysis using an example of a communication system.

See also 
 Reliability engineering
 Catastrophe theory

References

Further reading
 Active Networks and Active Network Management Section 9.4.2.

Systems theory